The Reserve Corps of the Cyprus Police (Or Efederiko), was a military force created by the detachment of Cypriot police officers, as the rival organization of the paramilitary organization, EOKA B, to fight and if possible, destroy it and to protect the then President of the Republic of Cyprus, Archbishop Makarios.

it had an active role in dealing with the Coup d'état of 1974, alongside the Cyprus Police and the Presidential Guard. The Reserve Corps was one of the strongest forms of resistance together with the other resistance police officers and in some cases, ordinary citizens of the Republic of Cyprus.

Controversy 
The Efedrikos existence and certain actions to tackle EOKA B has been criticised due to some tactics used (Such as torture, beatings and warantless arrests) in its campaign.

References 

Cyprus dispute
Military history of Cyprus
1974 in Cyprus
1973 in Cyprus
1973 establishments in Cyprus